Inishlyre (Irish: Inis Laidhre, meaning "Fork Island") is one of the last inhabited small islands in Clew Bay, Ireland, with a population of about 4 people in 2011.

Geography 
The island is located close to Rosmoney Pier near Kilmeena.

History 
In the 1851 Census there were 17 houses and 122 people living on the island. By 1911, that was down to 6 houses and 22 people. In the 19th Century there were 2 pubs on the Islands and sea merchants dropped cargo in the island because there was no deep-sea harbour in Westport.

Demographics 
The table below reports data on Inishlyre's population taken from Discover the Islands of Ireland (Alex Ritsema, Collins Press, 1999) and the Census of Ireland.

References 

Islands of County Mayo